The Sunset Cafe, also known as The Grand Terrace Cafe, was a jazz club in Chicago, Illinois operating during the 1920s, 1930s and 1940s. It was one of the most important jazz clubs in America, especially during the period between 1917 and 1928 when Chicago became a creative capital of jazz innovation and again during the emergence of bebop in the early 1940s.  From its inception, the club was a rarity as a haven from segregation, since the Sunset Cafe was an integrated or "Black and Tan" club where African Americans, along with other ethnicities, could mingle freely with white Americans without much fear of reprisal. Many important musicians developed their careers at the Sunset/Grand Terrace Cafe.

Original building

The building that housed the Cafe still stands at 315 E 35th St in the Bronzeville neighborhood of Chicago. Originally built in 1909 as an automobile garage, after a 1921 remodelling it became a venue with around 100 tables, a bandstand and dance floor.

While the historic structure that once housed New York's original Cotton Club was torn down decades ago for urban renewal, Chicago's original Sunset/Grand Terrace Cafe building still stands, and still has some of its original murals on the walls. The Sunset/Grand Terrace Cafe building returned to its modest roots after the then Grand Terrace Cafe closed in 1950, serving as a political office for a short time, and then an Ace Hardware store. The building received Chicago Landmark status on September 9, 1998.

Famous performers

Owned by Louis Armstrong's manager, Joe Glaser, the venue played host to such performers as Louis Armstrong, Adelaide Hall, Billie Holiday, Fletcher Henderson, Cab Calloway, Johnny Dodds, Bix Beiderbecke, Jimmy Dorsey, Benny Goodman, Gene Krupa and Earl "Fatha" Hines and his orchestra's members: Billy Eckstine, Dizzy Gillespie, Charlie Parker and  Sarah Vaughan.  On September 23, 1939, Ella Fitzgerald made her Chicago debut on this famous stage.

Louis Armstrong

Shortly after beginning to record his Hot Five records, Louis Armstrong began playing in the Carroll Dickerson Orchestra at the Sunset Cafe in 1926, with Earl Hines on piano. In July of that year, Percy Venable staged and produced Jazzmania, which had a finale with the whole cast supporting Armstrong as he sang "Heebie Jeebies." Venable would also later design a show with a "prime attraction," or Armstrong, singing "Big Butter and Egg Man" with Mae Alix. The band with Hines as musical director was soon renamed Louis Armstrong and his Stompers.

Cab Calloway

Cab Calloway got his professional start onstage under Louis Armstrong at the Sunset Cafe.  Calloway eventually became one of only a few big band leaders to come up under Armstrong and, of course, Earl Hines.  When Louis departed the Cafe for New York - it was the young Cab Calloway -  20-year-old "kid from Baltimore" whom Armstrong and Glazer picked to take over from Louis at the Sunset.  A few years later Calloway followed his mentor Armstrong to NY, and before long found himself headlining at The Cotton Club, while back in Chicago, Hines inherited the Sunset Cafe mantle. In 1928, the 25-year-old Earl Hines opened what was to become a twelve-year residency at what was now renamed The Grand Terrace Cafe - by now "controlled" [or 25% 'controlled'] by Al Capone.

Earl Hines

With Hines as its bandleader, what used to be the Sunset Cafe continued its tradition, introducing under Hines Charlie Parker, Dizzy Gillespie, Sarah Vaughan, Nat "King" Cole and Billy Eckstine, as well as the dancer - Bill "Bojangles" Robinson. And it was "live" from The Grand Terrace that the Hines Band became the most radio broadcast band in America.

Notes

Commercial buildings completed in 1909
Buildings and structures in Chicago
Chicago Landmarks
Douglas, Chicago
Jazz clubs in Chicago
Nightclubs in Chicago
African-American history in Chicago
Music venues completed in 1921
Defunct nightclubs in the United States
Defunct jazz clubs in Illinois
History of Chicago
South Side, Chicago